Cofe may refer to:
 Church of England
 Council of Europe
 Conference on the Future of Europe
 Coenzyme F420-0:L-glutamate ligase, an enzyme
 Coenzyme F420-1:gamma-L-glutamate ligase, an enzyme